The 2006–07 Serbian First League (referred to as the Prva Liga Telekom Srbija for sponsorship reasons) was the second season of the league under its current title.

League table

Playoffs

3rd to 6th place playoffs

Promotion playoffs

Top scorers

Hat-tricks

Notes

External links
 Official website
 Football Association of Serbia

Serbian First League seasons
2006–07 in Serbian football leagues
Serbia